Cynthia "Cindy" Adams (née Heller) is an American gossip columnist and writer. She is the widow of comedian/humorist Joey Adams.

Early life and education
Adams was an only child raised by her mother after her parents divorced.

Marriage to Joey Adams
Adams began to work as a photographer's model in Manhattan, and met her future husband, Joey Adams, a year later, when they appeared on the same radio show. They married on Valentine's Day 1952, and had no children. Joey died in 1999, following a long illness.

Writing career
Since 1979, Adams has written a gossip column for the New York Post, a New York City newspaper. She also contributed to Sunday Today in New York, a now-defunct newscast on WNBC television and had previously contributed twice a week on WNBC's Live at Five newscast, until it took on a new format on March 12, 2007.

Adams also wrote for local papers, including, eventually, the New York Post at the same time as her husband, who wrote a newspaper column for the Long Island Press on Long Island and later the New York Post. In 1965, she co-wrote an English-language autobiography of Indonesian president Sukarno, about whom she wrote another book two years later, during which he had been toppled by a pro-West general. In 1975, Adams published a biography of Jolie Gabor, the mother of the Gabor sisters. Among those whom she interviewed in 1970 was Mohammad Reza Pahlavi, the shah of Iran. Adams later became friendly with Imelda Marcos, the controversial widow of former Philippine president Ferdinand Marcos.

Adams became a syndicated newspaper columnist in 1981. Additionally, she was an original contributor to the syndicated, tabloid television A Current Affair and has appeared often on Good Morning America, a morning news-and-talk show on the ABC television network. In 1990, Adams served as a panelist on To Tell the Truth, an NBC television network game show.

She is known for ending her columns with the catch phrase: "Only in New York, kids, only in New York."

Animal activism
After her husband died in 1999, Adams developed a love for dogs. Jazzy, her Yorkshire Terrier, trailed her in public and became a minor celebrity himself. Adams and Jazzy would often dine together at New York City's finest restaurants, including Le Cirque. Adams dresses her dogs in expensive designer clothes and jewelry. She wrote a memoir about Jazzy, The Gift of Jazzy, and launched the Jazzy line of merchandise.

One weekend, Adams put Jazzy in a kennel in upstate New York when she left the city. By the time she returned Jazzy had died. She had a necropsy performed, which showed E. coli bacteria in the dog's system. In an article published in The New York Times, Adams was quoted as saying, "Now this is a dog that I hand-fed. I would lie on my stomach in the kitchen and hand-feed him kosher chicken. We would go to Le Cirque and eat off of Limoges porcelain. Where would he get E. coli?"

She became a vocal advocate for strengthening regulations of boarding kennels. In 2004, she garnered the support of television journalist Barbara Walters, socialite Ivana Trump, attorney Barry Slotnick, writer Tama Janowitz, and New York City Council Speaker Gifford Miller, to pass the Boarding Kennel and Regulation Act, also known as "Jazzy's Law". According to Adams, "To prevent others from suffering my Jazzy['s] pain, this local 'Boarding Kennel and Regulation Act' will: license kennels, monitor them regularly, fine those in violation, require records and rules, demand boarded pets prove vaccination and immunization against contagious doggy diseases." Despite the increasingly strict New York City health code, which only permits service animals in restaurants, Adams continues to bring her dogs to New York City restaurants.

Personal life
Adams lives and works from a nine-room penthouse apartment with a  veranda on Park Avenue in Manhattan, which she and her husband purchased from the estate of billionaire heiress Doris Duke in 1997. Because of the apartment's connection with Duke, Adams hosted the wrap party for the television biographical film Bernard and Doris (2008), about Duke's later years and Duke's relationship with her butler.

Her words after her husband's death included:
 "My career came because I married Joey."
 "This man gave me everything. Everything I have, I got from him. He introduced me to the world."

Illness in 2010
Adams ceased writing her regular New York Post column in May 2010 without notice, and there was no news beyond brief mentions that she was "unwell". In late June, Liz Smith, another gossip columnist (whose column used to be carried by the Post), reported in her online column that Adams was ill with a stomach malady. A Christian Scientist, Adams had avoided medical help until forced by friends Barbara Walters and television judge Judith Sheindlin to obtain it; Sheindlin became Adams' healthcare proxy as Adams has no immediate family. The diagnosis was said to be an almost-burst appendix. Smith reported on June 29, 2010 that "she [Adams] is now on the mend". From July 2010 through September 20, 2010, the New York Post noted that Adams will be "returning soon". She returned with a column detailing her illness on September 20, 2010. She wrote that she had had a ruptured appendix and anemia.

Bibliography
 Sukarno; Adams, Cindy Heller (1965). Sukarno An Autobiography. Bobbs-Merrill. (Indianapolis, Indiana; Kansas City, Missouri).  .
 Adams, Cindy Heller (1967). My Friend the Dictator. Bobbs-Merrill (Indianapolis, Indiana).  .
 Gabor, Jolie; Adams, Cindy Heller (1975). Jolie Gabor. Mason/Charter (New York City).  .
 Adams, Cindy Heller (1980). Lee Strasberg The Imperfect Genius of the World. Doubleday (Garden City, New York). .
 Adams, Cindy Heller; Crimp, Susan (1995). Iron Rose The Story of Rose Fitzgerald Kennedy and Her Dynasty. Dove Books (Beverly Hills, California). .
 Adams, Cindy (2003). The Gift of Jazzy. St. Martin's Press (New York City). .
 Adams, Cindy (2007). Living a Dog's LifeJazzy, Juicy, and Me. St. Martin's Press (St. Martin's Griffin imprint) (New York City). .

See also

 List of animal rights advocates
 List of biographers
 List of people from New York City

References

External links

1960s portrait of Cindy Adams, New York Public Library's Billy Rose Collection

1930 births
20th-century American biographers
American women biographers
20th-century American women writers
21st-century American women writers
American women columnists
20th-century American memoirists
Television personalities from New York City
American women television personalities
American gossip columnists
Living people
New York Post people
People from the Upper East Side
People from Washington Heights, Manhattan
People from Jamaica Estates, Queens
American women memoirists
American Christian Scientists
21st-century American non-fiction writers
Andrew Jackson High School (Queens) alumni
Writers from Manhattan
Writers from Queens, New York